Song Yi (died 207 BC) was a minister of the insurgent Chu kingdom during the final years of the Qin Dynasty.

Biography
Song Yi joined Xiang Liang's insurgent Chu kingdom around 209 BC, when rebellions broke out throughout China to overthrow the Qin Dynasty. In 208 BC, Xiang Liang found Xiong Xin, a descendant of the royal family of Chu, and installed him on the throne of Chu as King Huai II.

After engaging Qin forces in various battles, Xiang Liang began to grow contemptuous of the enemy due to the small amount of resistance that he encountered. Song Yi warned Xiang Liang that his overconfidence and his troops' inattentiveness would lead to defeat against the Qin army. At that time, the Lord of Gaoling (高陵君), an envoy from the insurgent Qi kingdom, was travelling to Chu and he encountered Song Yi along the way. Song Yi told him to slow down his pace because he was sure that Xiang Liang would meet his downfall. Song Yi's prediction was right as Xiang Liang was killed in action against the Qin army, led by Zhang Han, at the Battle of Dingtao.

The Lord of Gaoling met King Huai II later and recommended Song Yi to the king, saying that Song "may indeed be said to understand the art of warfare." The king summoned Song Yi and discussed strategic issues with him, after which he appointed Song Yi as commander-in-chief of his army, with Xiang Yu (Xiang Liang's nephew) and Fan Zeng serving as his deputies. Song Yi was commissioned to lead an army to reinforce the Zhao kingdom, which was under attack by Qin.

In 207 BC, the army reached Anyang (安陽; southeast of present-day Cao County, Heze, Shandong) and Song Yi ordered them to halt and wait for 46 days without making further movement. As the Zhao capital Handan was under siege by Qin forces, Xiang Yu advised an immediate crossing of the Yellow River to attack the Qin army, but Song Yi ignored him, preferring to move when Zhao and Qin were exhausted from fighting each other. Song Yi then gave an order that any man who was "fierce as a tiger, recalcitrant as a ram, greedy as a wolf, so headstrong they will not submit to orders" should be decapitated, hinting that the assassination of Xiang Yu would be agreeable to him. He sent his son, Song Xiang (宋襄), to the Qi kingdom, and accompanied his son to a drinking party at Wuyan (無鹽; east of present-day Dongping County, Tai'an, Shandong).

Xiang Yu was angry with Song Yi and he gave a speech to the other generals, decrying Song's extravagance and unconcerned attitude towards military affairs. The next morning, when entering the commander's tent to make his morning report, Xiang Yu took Song Yi by surprise and killed him, seizing Song's command of the army. Xiang Yu then denounced Song Yi for committing treason, saying that Song was plotting with Qi against Chu, and his execution was authorised by the king.

References

Chinese generals
Qin dynasty people
207 BC deaths
Year of birth unknown